G&G may stand for:

 Ekaterina Gordeeva and Sergei Grinkov (skaters)
 G&G Entertainment
 G&G Sindikatas, a Lithuanian hip hop/rap band formed in 1996